Pascual is a Spanish given name and surname, cognate of Italian name Pasquale, Portuguese name Pascoal and French name Pascal. In Catalan-speaking area (including Andorra, Valencia, and Balearic islands) Pascual has the variant Pasqual.

Pascual, like Pasquale/Pasqual/Pascal, derives from the Latin paschalis or pashalis, which means "relating to Easter", from Latin pascha ("Easter"), Greek Πάσχα, Aramaic pasḥā, in turn from the Hebrew pesach, which means "to be born on, or to be associated with, Passover day". Since the Hebrew holiday Passover coincides closely with the later Christian holiday of Easter, the Latin word came to be used for both occasions. In the Katalani Hebrew tradition the name is given to the first born male child.

Pascual may refer to:

Given name
 Pascual de Andagoya (1495–1548), a Spanish Basque conquistador
 Pascual Jordan (1902–1980), a German theoretical and mathematical physicist of Spanish ancestors
 Pascual Madoz (1806–1870), a Spanish politician and statistician
 Pascual Orozco (1882–1915), a Mexican revolutionary leader
 Pascual Ortiz Rubio (1877–1963), former Mexican president during the Maximato government
 Pascual Romero (born 1980), an American musician and film producer

Surname

 Alfredo Pascual (born 1948), Filipino businessman and former president of the University of the Philippines
 Bernard Pascual (born 1967), French footballer
 Beatriz Pascual Rodríguez, Spanish racewalker
 Camilo Alberto Pascual Lus (born 1934), Cuban baseball player
 Carolina Pascual (born 1976), Spanish rhythmic gymnast
 Claudia Pascual (born 1972), Chilean anthropologist and politician
 Ernest Benach y Pascual (born 1959), President of the Catalan Parliament
 Jake Pascual (born 1988), Filipino basketball player
 Peter Pascual (died 1299), Spanish theologian
 Piolo Pascual (born 1977), Filipino actor, model, musician and film producer
 Ronald Pascual (born 1988), Filipino basketball player
 Virginia Ruano Pascual (born 1973), Spanish professional female tennis player
 Jose Miguel Pascual (born 2000), Filipino basketball player

Other
 Convent of San Pascual, a royal monastery in Aranjuez, Madrid, Spain
 Pascual Boing, a Mexican fruit juice and soft drink company
Productos alimenticios Pascual, a Panamanian cookie making company

See also
 Pasqual (disambiguation)
 Pasquale (disambiguation)
 Pascal (disambiguation)

Spanish masculine given names
Spanish-language surnames